Leptofoenus is a genus of wasp in the family Pteromalidae, the type genus subfamily Leptofoeninae found in South America, Central America, and southern North America. The genus contains five living species and one extinct species known from early Miocene Burdigalian stage Dominican amber deposits on the island of Hispaniola.  With body sizes ranging from  Leptofoenus species are larger than nearly all other species in Pteromalidae.  The genus bears a notable resemblance to the wasp families Pelecinidae, Gasteruptiidae, and Stephanidae.

Species 
All six known species are restricted to the western Hemisphere, most being found in South America and only one reaching North America.

Leptofoenus howardi (Ashmead) Paraguay, Brazil, Surinam
Leptofoenus peleciniformis Smith Brazil, Peru, Venezuela, Costa Rica
†Leptofoenus pittfieldae Engel  Dominican Republic (Early Miocene)
Leptofoenus rufus LaSalle & Stage Mexico, southwestern USA
Leptofoenus stephanoides (Roman) Argentina, Paraguay, Brazil, French Guiana, Venezuela, Colombia, Panama, Costa Rica, southern Mexico
Leptofoenus westwoodi (Ashmead) Argentina, Bolivia, Brazil, Peru, Venezuela, Guyana, Trinidad, Panama

References 

Pteromalidae